Ecyroschema morini is a species of beetle in the family Cerambycidae. It was described by Téocchi, Jiroux, Sudre and Ture in 2008. It is known from the Democratic Republic of the Congo, and the Ivory Coast.

References

Crossotini
Beetles described in 2008